Ajeanie Khadeem Talbott (born 27 March 1998) is a Jamaican footballer who plays as a defender for São João de Ver and the Jamaica national football team.

Early life and education 

Talbott was born in Kingston and played for Jamaica College in secondary school.

Career

Club 
Following a move from Cavalier youth set up in 2015, Talbott made his professional debut for Harbour view in the same year. Following the resumption of football due to the Covid-19 virus, Talbott was named as the new captain for Harbour view ahead of the 2021 season. 

On 15 September 2021, Portuguese  club Sporting Clube Sao Joao De Ver announced the signing of Talbott on a 3 month loan.

International
Talbott has represented Jamaica at the youth and senior levels. He represented Jamaica at the U17, U20 and U23 age groups, captaining both the U17 and U23 teams. In 2018, at just 20-years-old, Talbott received his first call up to the Jamaican senior national team from head coach Theodore Whitmore, starting back to back friendly internationals against Grenada and Barbados. In 2019, Talbott was selected as part of Jamaica's provisional roster from the 2019 CONCACAF Gold Cup.

Career statistics

Club

Notes

International

References

External links
 Ajeanie Talbott at caribbeanfootballdatabase.com

1999 births
Living people
Jamaican footballers
Jamaica international footballers
Association football defenders
Cavalier F.C. players
Harbour View F.C. players
National Premier League players
Jamaica under-20 international footballers
Jamaica youth international footballers